Castle is an American comedy-drama police procedural television series on ABC which was created by Andrew W. Marlowe. It stars Nathan Fillion as Richard Castle, a famous mystery novelist, and Stana Katic as NYPD detective Kate Beckett. The series premiered as a midseason replacement on March 9, 2009. On May 12, 2016, it was announced that, despite several cast members signing one-year deals for a potential ninth season, the show would be canceled instead.

Series overview

Episodes

Season 1 (2009)

Season 2 (2009–10)

Season 3 (2010–11)

Season 4 (2011–12)

Season 5 (2012–13)

Season 6 (2013–14)

Season 7 (2014–15)

Season 8 (2015–16)

Notes

References

General references

External links
 

Lists of American comedy-drama television series episodes
Lists of American crime drama television series episodes
Episodes